Abdelkader Mohamed (born 1935) is a Moroccan footballer. He competed in the men's tournament at the 1964 Summer Olympics.

References

External links
 

1935 births
Living people
Moroccan footballers
Morocco international footballers
Olympic footballers of Morocco
Footballers at the 1964 Summer Olympics
Place of birth missing (living people)
Association football forwards
AS FAR (football) players
Botola players